The Castle is a 1997 film by Austrian director Michael Haneke. It is an adaptation of Franz Kafka's absurdist 1926 novel released theatrically in Germany, The Czech Republic, Japan, Canada, and the USA , but first shown on television in Austria.

Plot
When land surveyor K. (Ulrich Mühe) arrives at a small village that houses a castle, local authorities refuse to allow him to enter. As he tries to convince the officials that they sent for him, they clamp down with increasingly complicated bureaucratic obstacles.

Production and release
Das Schloß was filmed in Styria.

The film premiered at the 47th Berlin International Film Festival in February 1997.

References

External links

1997 television films
1997 films
Austrian television films
Films directed by Michael Haneke
1990s German-language films
Films based on works by Franz Kafka
Films based on Czech novels
Films shot in Austria
Television shows based on Czech novels
German-language television shows
Films set in castles